The Midas Touch is a 2013 Hong Kong comedy film directed by Andrew Fung and starring Chapman To and Charlene Choi as talent managers.

Plot
Successful debt collector Chiu takes pity on a group of wannabe pop starlets when he goes to collect from the agency they are signed with. Naively thinking that he can do a better job in launching their careers, Chiu takes over the company in lieu of the debt but starts to realize he may have overextended himself. Hoping that things might change with a strategic approach, he hires experienced talent manager Suen but with money running low and the company on the brink of bankruptcy, a dejected Chiu is soon ready to admit that his Midas touch has run out until a Korean showbiz entity expresses interest in the girls.

Now Chiu has to decide whether he is willing to say goodbye to his investment and, more importantly, to a dream he has come close to achieving.

Cast
Chapman To as Mak Chiu (麥超)
Charlene Choi as Suen Mei-mei (孫美美)
Gao Yunxiang as J-Dragon (劍龍)
Christie Chen as Peggy (沛堅)
Alice Li as Nancy (楠楠)
Una Xie as Dodo (杜頌)
Jie Zhuang as Marilyn (瑪莉蓮)
Venus Wong as River (淼淼)
Angela Hui as Mona (白日夢)
Jennifer Zhang as Flora (阿花)
Deep Ng as Beefy (牛河)
Johnny Choi as Fries (薯條)
Ryan Lam as Toast (多士)
Masaki Heung as Salad (沙律)
Jenny Lau as Winky (陳詠)

Special appearance
Wong Cho-lam as Gibson
Gillian Chung as Chinese-Korean policewoman
He Jiong as Nancy's brother 
Hins Cheung as Robber
Lo Hoi-pang as Boss Chow (周老闆)
Yumiko Cheng as Tina
Stephanie Che as Keung (阿強)
Louis Cheung as Model agency boss
6-Wing as Master Rain (雨雲大師)
Eric Kwok as Director
Steven Cheung as Director David Tam (譚大衛)
Vincy Chan as PR lady
Tyson Chak as Ben
Lam Chak-kwan as Master of variety
Ma Yuk-sing as Action choreographer
Mani Fok as Mani
Law Chi-leung as Tony
Derek Kwok as Peter
Law Wing-cheung as Film workshop boss
Nicholas Tse as himself

Critical response

Andrew Chan of the Film Critics Circle of Australia writes, "There is also not enough laugh out loud moments for the film to be a comedy and when it tries for dramatic effects, it feels rather odd."

References

2013 films
Hong Kong comedy films
2013 comedy films
2010s Cantonese-language films
Films set in Hong Kong
Films shot in Hong Kong
2010s Hong Kong films